Goldschmidt is a German surname meaning "Goldsmith". It may refer to:

 Adalbert von Goldschmidt (1848-1906), composer
 Adolph Goldschmidt (1863–1944), art historian
 Adolphe Goldschmidt (1838–1918), German-British banker
 Berthold Goldschmidt (1903–1996), composer
 Carl Wolfgang Benjamin Goldschmidt (1807-1851), astronomer, mathematician, and physicist
 Christina Goldschmidt, British statistician
 David M. Goldschmidt (born 1942), American mathematician
 Elisabeth Goldschmidt (1912–1970), Israeli geneticist
 Georges-Arthur Goldschmidt (born 1928), French writer and translator of German origin
 Hans Goldschmidt (1861–1923), chemist, son of Theodor Goldschmidt
 Harold Goldsmith, born Hans Goldschmidt (1930–2004), American Olympic foil and épée fencer
 Heinrich Jacob Goldschmidt (1857–1937), Austrian chemist, father of Victor Moritz Goldschmidt, founder of modern geochemistry
 Hermann Goldschmidt (1802–1866), astronomer and painter
 Hilde Goldschmidt (1897–1980), artist  
 Jakob Goldschmidt (1882-1955), German banker
 John Goldschmidt (born 1943), film director and producer
 Lazarus Goldschmidt (1871–1950), German writer and translator
 Levin Goldschmidt (1829–1897), jurist
 Márcia Goldschmidt (1962), Brazilian TV presenter
 Marie Goldschmidt (1890–1917), French aeronaut
 Meïr Aaron Goldschmidt (1819–1887), publisher and writer
 Neil Goldschmidt (born 1940), U.S. politician
 Nicholas Goldschmidt (1908-2004), conductor, artistic director
 Otto Goldschmidt (1829–1907), German composer
 Pascal Goldschmidt (–), cardiologist, and dean of University of Miami School of Medicine
 Paul Goldschmidt (born 1987), American baseball player
 Pinchas Goldschmidt (born 1963), Chief Rabbi of Moscow and President of the CER
 Richard Benedikt Goldschmidt (1878–1958), geneticist
 Robert Goldschmidt (1877–1935), Belgian physicist
 Rudolf Goldschmidt (1876–1950), engineer and inventor
 Samuel Goldschmidt, German banker in Berlin
 Siegfried Goldschmidt (1844–1884), German Indologist
 Theodor Goldschmidt (1817–1875), chemist
 Tijs Goldschmidt (born 1953), Dutch writer and evolutionary biologist
 Victor Mordechai Goldschmidt (1853–1933), chemist
 Victor Moritz Goldschmidt (1888–1947), geochemist, considered the founder of modern geochemistry. Son of Heinrich Jacob Goldschmidt, Austrian chemist
 Victor Goldschmidt (philosopher) (1914–1981), French historian of philosophy

Similar names
 Goldschmidt family
 Goldschmid
 Goldschmied
 Goldschmitt
 Goldsmid
 Goldsmith
 Aurifaber

Geochemistry
 Goldschmidt classification (geochemistry)
 Goldschmidt tolerance factor (geochemistry)
 V. M. Goldschmidt Award, American science award in geochemistry

Surnames
Occupational surnames
German-language surnames
Jewish surnames
Yiddish-language surnames